Qaleh Jabreil (also Romanized as Qal‘eh Jabre’īl and Qal‘eh-ye Jabrā’īl; also known as Deh Bālā, Deh-i-Jurail, and Deh Zhūrā) is a village in Agahan Rural District, Kolyai District, Sonqor County, Kermanshah Province, Iran. At the 2006 census, its population was 66, in 16 families.

References 

Populated places in Sonqor County